Anne White and Robin White were the defending champions but only Robin White competed that year with Gigi Fernández.

Fernández and White lost in the final 4–6, 6–2, 7–6 against Pam Shriver and Helena Suková.

Seeds
Champion seeds are indicated in bold text while text in italics indicates the round in which those seeds were eliminated.

 Pam Shriver /  Helena Suková (champions)
 Elizabeth Smylie /  Wendy Turnbull (semifinals)
 Gigi Fernández /  Robin White (final)
 Leila Meskhi /  Natasha Zvereva (semifinals)

Draw

External links
 ITF tournament edition details

Pan Pacific Open
Pan Pacific Open - Doubles
1988 in Japanese tennis